The Durocasses were a Gallic tribe dwelling around present-day Dreux during the Roman period.

Name 

They are mentioned Durocasis (var. durocacasis) on the Itinerarium Antonini (early 3rd c. AD), as Durocassio on the Tabula Peutingeriana (4–5th c. AD), and as Dorocas on Merovingian coins.

The etymology of the ethnonym Durocasses remains unclear. The meaning of the second element -casses, attested in other Gaulish ethnonyms such as Bodiocasses, Sucasses, Tricasses, Veliocasses, or Viducasses, has been debated, but it probably signifies '(curly) hair, hairstyle' (cf. Old Irish chass 'curl'), perhaps referring to a particular warrior coiffure.

The city of Dreux, attested ca. 930 AD as Drocas (Drewes in the 12th c.), is named after the Gallic tribe.

Economy 
The production of coins by the Durocasses suggests that they benefited from some economic autonomy. Their wealth probably came from tolls collected on the inland water shipping on the Eure river.

References

Bibliography 

 

Gauls